Land 2 Air Chronicles II: Imitation Is Suicide Chapter 2 is an EP by American singer-songwriter Kenna.  It is the second of three EPs in the Land 2 Air Chronicles II series, released from September 2013 to December 2013.

Track listing

References 

Kenna albums
2013 EPs